Sarv-e Sofla (also Romanized as Sarv-e Soflá; also known as Sarv, Sarv-e Pā’īn, Sarv Pā’īn, and Sarv Sufla) is a village in Aqda Rural District, Aqda District, Ardakan County, Yazd Province, Iran. At the 2006 census, its population was 178, divided into 62 families.

References 

Populated places in Ardakan County